The Jack M. Murdock House, at 652 Rossie Hill Dr. in Park City, Utah, was built around 1895.  It was listed on the National Register of Historic Places in 1984.

It is a one-story "T/L cottage" with a gable roof.  It has a hipped roof porch supported by lathe-turned piers.

References

National Register of Historic Places in Summit County, Utah
Houses completed in 1895